Liobagrus styani is a species of catfish in the family Amblycipitidae (the torrent catfishes) endemic to the province of Hubei in China. This species reaches a length of  TL.

References

Further reading

External links 
 

Liobagrus
Freshwater fish of China
Endemic fauna of China
Taxa named by Charles Tate Regan
Fish described in 1908